Kristoffer Nilsen Svartbækken Grindalen (9 September 1804 – 25 February 1876) was a Norwegian criminal, killer and thief. He was born at the crofter's farm Nordre Svartbækken in Elverum, and spent 41 years of his life in prisons. He was convicted for a murder and robbery near Ekrumstormyra in Løten in 1875, and was beheaded by axe at the site of the murder in 1876, witnessed by 2,500 spectators, in the last public and civil execution in Norway. Moments before his beheading he confessed to the murder.

Henrik Sørensen's painting Svartbækken from 1908, inspired by the incident, was much discussed, but is regarded as Sørensen's breakthrough.

References

Further reading

1804 births
1876 deaths
19th-century Norwegian criminals
Norwegian male criminals
People from Elverum
People from Løten
Norwegian people convicted of murder
People executed by Norway by decapitation
Executed Norwegian people
People executed for murder
19th-century executions by Norway